VA-113 has the following meanings:
Attack Squadron 113 (U.S. Navy)
State Route 113 (Virginia)